Lacs is a prefecture located in the Maritime Region of Togo. The prefecture seat is located in Aného.  It contains Togo's easternmost point.

The current president of Togo, Faure Gnassingbé, was born in Lacs Prefecture.

Canton (administrative divisions) of Lacs include Aného, Agbodrafo, Glidji-Aklakou, Anfoin, Fiata, Agouègan, and Ganavé

Populated places
 Attitogon
 Aného

References 

Prefectures of Togo
Maritime Region